Nayyab Ali is a Pakistani human rights defender, transgender activist and social scientist with ten years of experience in working on gender equality, livelihoods and economic empowerment. As an independent consultant, she has been associated with UN agencies to advocate transgender rights. In 2020, she was awarded the Franco-German Prize for Human Rights. She became one of the first few transgender people who ran for election in the 2018 Pakistan elections. She is the first Pakistani to receive the GALA awards. She is first Transgender Woman to elect as Co- Chairperson of EVAW/G Alliance Pakistan The United Nations Development Programme (UNDP) Pakistan has declared International Award Winner Transgender rights activist Nayyab Ali as Gender Equality Advocate in Pakistan.

As a researcher and renowned activist, working on gender and minority inclusion issues, Ms. Nayyab Ali has been a resource person for building law enforcement agencies' capacities and sensitisation across Pakistan and for tackling the political, institutional and social challenges of the transgender community. Her expertise, experience and personal journey have led her to become the national coordinator of All Pakistan Transgender Election Network, to be an active member of the special committee formed for the review of the bill, which became the Pakistan transgender Persons (Protection of Rights) Act 2018 and also to create the first school for Okara's transgender community.

Personal life 
Ali was born as Muhammad Arslan in Okara city, Punjab district. She was disowned by her family at an early age of 13, when she was in her eighth grade. She then moved to her grandmother's house where she continued her education. Nayab started working for transgender rights when she was 17 years old. Later on, she started living with a Guru; the head of transgender sanctuaries. She is also a victim of acid attacks and was harassed during her time as a student.

Education 
Nayyab is among the few educated transgender people in her country. She pursued a bachelor's degree in botany, from the University of Punjab and later did her master's degree in international relations from Preston University, Islamabad.

Career

Teaching 
Nayyab has remained a teacher prior to her political career. She also has served as Transgender Rights Expert Consultant at UNDP, Nayyab Ali is one of the most prominent transgender people of Pakistan. She is an activist, educator, and one of the Master Trainers of #UNDPinPakistan. Despite suffering many personal tragedies, she has dedicated her life to activism and a struggle to protect the rights of the trans community.

Activism 
Nayab has been advocating transgender rights from an early age. She has worked for the welfare of transgender community in Pakistan and also started her own venture, the 'Khawaja Sira Community' in Okara, which offers a basic literacy and numeracy programme, vocational training, life skills education and driving classes for the transgender community. She has served as Chairperson, All Pakistan Transgender Election Network (APTEN). For the past decade, Nayab has been giving technical support to the government institutions to improve the lives of her community and get them their basic human rights. She is the first transgender person in Pakistan to register her company with the Securities and Exchange Commission of Pakistan (SECP).

Nayyab Ali  had provided technical support for community input and for setting up a basic legislative framework for the protection of Transgender Rights in Pakistan.

Politics 
After a historic bill passed in 2018, that granted the transgender community a right to obtain legal documents, right to vote and stand in election. Nayab, along with 12 other transgender candidates became the first of their community to stand in the 2018 Pakistan elections. She stood for the national assembly seat NA-142 in Okara in the 2018 elections on PTI's Ayesha Gulalai's seat and was able to receive a total of 1197 votes, which was more than many of her female counterparts.

Nayab is also a member of the provincial voter committee of the Election Commission of Pakistan. and also a part of the All Pakistan Transgender Election Network in Punjab.

Awards 
Nayab Ali became the first person from Pakistan to receive the GALA International Activist Award held in Dublin, Ireland in 2020. The awards, which are organized by the National X Federation of Ireland (NXF), recognized Nayab as "an international activist outside of Ireland who works tirelessly to promote the full equality and inclusion of gender minorities people in society"., She is the Laureate of Franco - German Prize for Human Rights & Rule of Law 2020 She is also Laureate of APCOM HERO ASIA Award under Transgender Category in 2020. 

Nayyab Ali became Pakistan's first transgender person to win the 2nd Interactive Youth Forum (ISYD) 2020 award on working for ensuring basic rights to her fellow community.

References 

Pakistani women's rights activists
Transgender rights activists
21st-century Pakistani women politicians
Pakistani LGBT politicians
Pakistani transgender people
Year of birth missing (living people)
Living people
Transgender women
Transgender scientists
Transgender politicians
Pakistani LGBT rights activists